G. Udayagiri, or simply Udayagiri, is a town and a notified area committee in Kandhamal district  in the state of Odisha, India.

Geography

Demographics
 India census, G. Udayagiri had a population of 10,206. Males constitute 49% of the population and females 51%. G. Udayagiri has an average literacy rate of 74%, higher than the national average of 59.5%: male literacy is 81%, and female literacy is 68%. In G. Udayagiri, 12% of the population is under 6 years of age.

References

Cities and towns in Kandhamal district